Mannadipet is one of the 4 Firkas of Villianur taluk in Pondicherry (North) Revenue Sub-division of the Indian union territory of Puducherry.

Revenue villages
The following are the revenue villages under Mannadipet Firka

 Chettipet
 Kalithirthalkuppam
 Kunichampet
 Madagadipet
 Manalipet
 Mannadipet
 Sanyasikuppam
 Thirubuvanai
 Thiruvandarkoil
 Vadhanur

See also
Kodathur firka
Thondamanatham firka
Villianur firka

References

External links
 Department of Revenue and Disaster Management, Government of Puducherry

Geography of Puducherry
Puducherry district